In statistics, the complex Wishart distribution is a complex version of the Wishart distribution.  It is the distribution of  times the sample Hermitian covariance matrix of  zero-mean independent Gaussian random variables.  It has support for  Hermitian positive definite matrices.

The complex Wishart distribution is the density of a complex-valued sample covariance matrix.  Let

If the covariance of G is  then

where  is the complex central Wishart distribution with n degrees of freedom and mean value, or scale matrix, M.

where

is the complex multivariate Gamma function. 

Using the trace rotation rule  we also get

which is quite close to the complex multivariate pdf of G itself.  The elements of G conventionally have circular symmetry such that .

Inverse Complex Wishart
The distribution of the inverse complex Wishart distribution of  according to Goodman, Shaman is

where .

If derived via a matrix inversion mapping, the result depends on the complex Jacobian determinant 

Goodman and others discuss such complex Jacobians.

Eigenvalues

The probability distribution of the eigenvalues of the complex Hermitian Wishart distribution are given by, for example, James and Edelman.  For a  matrix with  degrees of freedom we have 

where 

For the definition more common in engineering circles, with X and Y each having 0.5 variance, the eigenvalues are reduced by a factor of 2.

While this expression gives little insight, there are approximations for marginal eigenvalue distributions.  From Edelman we have that if S is a sample from the complex Wishart distribution with  such that 
then in the limit  the distribution of eigenvalues converges in probability to the Marchenko–Pastur distribution function

A special case is  

or, if a Var(Z) = 1 convention is used then
.
The Wigner semicircle distribution arises by making the change of variable  in the latter and selecting the sign of y randomly yielding pdf

In place of the definition of the Wishart sample matrix above, we can define a Gaussian ensemble

such that S is the matrix product . The real non-negative eigenvalues of S are then the modulus-squared singular values of the ensemble  and the moduli of the latter have a quarter-circle distribution.

In the case  such that  then  is rank deficient with at least  null eigenvalues.

such that  is upper triangular with full rank and  has further reduced dimensionality.

The eigenvalues are of practical significance in radio communications theory since they define the Shannon channel capacity of a   MIMO wireless channel which, to first approximation, is modeled as a zero-mean complex Gaussian ensemble.

References

Continuous distributions
Multivariate continuous distributions
Covariance and correlation
Random matrices
Conjugate prior distributions
Exponential family distributions
Complex distributions